Scottsbluff is a city in Scotts Bluff County, in the western part of the state of Nebraska, in the Great Plains region of the United States. The population was 14,436 at the 2020 census. Scottsbluff is the largest city in the Nebraska Panhandle, and the 13th largest city in Nebraska.

Scottsbluff was founded in 1899 across the North Platte River from its namesake, a bluff that is now protected by the National Park Service as Scotts Bluff National Monument. The monument was named after Hiram Scott (1805–1828), a fur trader with the Rocky Mountain Fur Company who was found dead in the vicinity on the return trip from a fur expedition. The smaller town of Gering had been founded south of the river in 1887. The two cities have since grown together to form the 7th largest urban area (the Scottsbluff Micropolitan Statistical Area) in Nebraska.

History
Scottsbluff was founded in 1899 by the Lincoln Land Company, a subsidiary of the Burlington Railroad. By 1900, the Burlington Railroad laid tracks into the town, and placed a discarded boxcar next to the tracks as a temporary depot. Scottsbluff was the first town in the region to be located along a railroad line, resulting in some older businesses relocating from Gering to Scottsbluff.

Other names
In the Lakota language, Scottsbluff is called pȟaŋkéska wakpá otȟúŋwahe ("Platte River City", lit. "abalone river city").

Geography and climate
Scottsbluff is located at  (41.867140, −103.660709).

Scottsbluff has a cold semi-arid climate (Köppen climate classification BSk), bordering on a hot-summer humid continental climate (Koppen: Dfa) with wide seasonal and day-to-day variation as well as a large diurnal temperature variation, and is located in USDA Plant Hardiness Zone 5a. Summers are hot, and winters dry and cold, though chinook winds can loosen the cold's grip, often bringing temperatures above . Over the course of a year, there is an average 6 days with maxima  or above, 49.1 days with maxima reaching at least , 27.4 days with a maximum at or below the freezing mark, and 11.6 days with minima at or below .

The months of November 1939 and March 2012 did not see even a trace of precipitation, while nineteen other months since 1893 have seen only a trace.

Demographics

2010 census
As of the census of 2010, there were 15,039 people, 6,168 households, and 3,672 families residing in the city. The racial makeup of the city was 83.0% White, 0.8% African American, 3.4% Native American, 0.8% Asian, 9.8% from other races, and 2.2% from two or more races. Hispanic or Latino of any race were 29.1% of the population.

There were 6,168 households, of which 30.5% had children under the age of 18 living with them, 41.7% were married couples living together, 12.5% had a female householder with no husband present, 5.3% had a male householder with no wife present, and 40.5% were non-families. 34.6% of all households were made up of individuals, and 14.3% had someone living alone who was 65 years of age or older. The average household size was 2.35 and the average family size was 3.04.

The median age in the city was 36 years. 24.9% of residents were under the age of 18; 10.7% were between the ages of 18 and 24; 23.8% were from 25 to 44; 23.7% were from 45 to 64; and 16.7% were 65 years of age or older. The gender makeup of the city was 47.6% male and 52.4% female.

According to a 2008 article in Quality Health entitled 10 Fattest Cities in America, 31% of Scottsbluff's population is obese, making it the 7th fattest city in America.

2000 census
As of the census of 2000, there were 14,732 people, 6,088 households, and 3,841 families residing in the city. The population density was 2,504.5 people per square mile (967.4/km). There were 6,559 housing units at an average density of 1,115.1 per square mile (430.7/km). The racial makeup of the city was 81.88% White, 0.44% African American, 3.20% Native American, 0.75% Asian, 0.04% Pacific Islander, 11.60% from other races, and 2.10% from two or more races. Hispanic or Latino of any race were 23.59% of the population.

There were 6,088 households, out of which 30.6% had children under the age of 18 living with them, 46.7% were married couples living together, 12.9% had a female householder with no husband present, and 36.9% were non-families. 32.4% of all households were made up of individuals, and 14.7% had someone living alone who was 65 years of age or older. The average household size was 2.36 and the average family size was 2.99.

In the city, the population was spread out, with 26.5% under the age of 18, 9.8% from 18 to 24, 25.2% from 25 to 44, 20.7% from 45 to 64, and 17.8% who were 65 years of age or older. The median age was 36 years. For every 100 females, there were 87.0 males. For every 100 females age 18 and over, there were 82.1 males.

As of 2000 the median income for a household in the city was $29,938, and the median income for a family was $37,778. Males had a median income of $30,307 versus $20,854 for females. The per capita income for the city was $17,065. About 14.5% of families and 18.3% of the population were below the poverty line, including 28.5% of those under age 18 and 10.0% of those age 65 or over.

Education
Scottsbluff is home to the main campus of Western Nebraska Community College. In addition, several other Nebraska institutions maintain centers and offer select courses or programs in the city, including the University of Nebraska Medical Center College of Nursing, Chadron State College, and the University of Nebraska (Panhandle Research and Extension Center).

The now-defunct Hiram Scott College was located a few miles north of the city.

Points of interest
 Grave of Rebecca Winters (Mormon Pioneer)
 Lake Minatare State Recreation Area
 Riverside Discovery Center
 Western Nebraska Community College
 Fort Mitchell
 Cedar Canyon
 Carter Canyon
 Robidoux Pass

Landmark buildings

 Old Post Office
 Midwest Theater
 Lincoln Hotel
 Great Western Sugar Factory
 Lake Minatare Lighthouse
 Bluffs Middle School
 Scottsbluff High School
 Scottsbluff County Courthouse
 Scottsbluff Carnegie Library

Media

Transportation

Public transit

Tri-City Roadrunner is the public transit bus system in Scottsbluff, Nebraska, United States. It operates 2 regular bus routes on weekdays from 6:30 a.m. to 6:30 p.m. There is no service on weekends. Two deviated fixed route services are provided, allowing for 3/4 mile deviations from the normal route. Fixed route services began on January 10, 2018 with 4 buses and 14 drivers. The Blue Route and the Orange Route operate north-south between Scottsbluff and Gering, but utilize different alignments to maximize coverage of the cities. In addition to the two deviated fixed routes, there is demand response service available to anywhere in any of the cities served or rural Scotts Bluff County.

Fixed Route Ridership

The ridership and service statistics shown here are of fixed route services only and do not include demand response.

Major highways
 U.S. Highway 26 - east–west route through Scottsbluff
 Nebraska Route 71 - north–south route through Scottsbluff
 Nebraska Route 92 - route going west from Scottsbluff to Wyoming border.

Airport
The Scottsbluff area is served by Western Nebraska Regional Airport.  United Express serves the airport with twice-daily service to Denver International Airport.

Notable people
 Hank Bauer, former American football running back, professional television and radio broadcaster.
 Brook Berringer, the former University of Nebraska quarterback was born in Scottsbluff in 1973.  (His family moved to Goodland, Kansas, after his father's death.)
 Terry Carpenter, American politician
 Walt Conley, folk singer, musician and actor.
 Kip Gross, retired Major League Baseball pitcher for the Cincinnati Reds, Los Angeles Dodgers, Boston Red Sox, and Houston Astros.
 Nik Ingersöll, American entrepreneur and designer.
 Galen B. Jackman, U.S. Army major general (retired), Nancy Reagan's escort throughout the state funeral proceedings of former U.S. President Ronald Reagan, first commanding general of Joint Force Headquarters National Capital Region
 Nate Lashley, (b. 1982) professional golfer on the PGA tour
 Jacqueline Logan, silent film actress spent her childhood in Scottsbluff.
 Vic Marker, three-time Midwest Golden Glove boxer, who beat Archie Moore in the Golden Glove Finals in the late 1930s.
 Randy Meisner, former bassist of the rock band the Eagles
 Adrian Smith, U.S. Representative

Sister city
Bamiyan, Afghanistan

See also
 List of bus transit systems in the United States

References

External links

1900 establishments in Nebraska
Cities in Scotts Bluff County, Nebraska
Cities in Nebraska
Populated places established in 1900
Scottsbluff Micropolitan Statistical Area
Transportation in Scotts Bluff County, Nebraska
Bus transportation in Nebraska